The 2008 Australian Rally Championship Season is the 41st Season in the history of the competition. This year once again there will be 6 classes in the competition and over 50 official drivers and 48 teams.

The Rallies
The 2008 Season has once again featured a total of 6 Rallies across Australia starting at the QUIT Rally until the final event at Coffs Harbour.

Teams & Drivers

Officially, this season, there will be only one factory-built team competing in the competition. This will be the TTR (Toyota Team Racing) Team. They win the Manufacturer's title for the 3rd consecutive season by default, this is due to the Ford-based Focus RS team of last season pulling out and instead deciding to field a Subaru and changed their Name to PIRTEK LWR Rally Team.

There are other manufacturers competing as Privateer teams which don't represent the manufacturer unlike the TTR team which represents Toyota, such as the Evans Motorsport Team which uses a Subaru but isn't backed by the manufacturer. All in all, there will be over 50 drivers competing across numerous classes. The Super 2000 class will once again be the Top-Category which is followed by the Group N and the Privateers competition which sees privately owned teams competing.

2008 Rallies

see: 2008 Rally of WA
see: 2008 International Rally of Canberra

Broadcasting

The series will once again be broadcast on the Australian channel, Channel 10 which will have a 1-hour magazine-type show on Sunday afternoons, on the same week as the events are actually taking place and concluding. All of the events will be broadcast between 12 p.m. and 1 p.m on Sunday.

Drivers Championship

References

Rally Championship
Australia
Rally competitions in Australia